A cultural universal (also called an anthropological universal or human universal) is an element, pattern, trait, or institution that is common to all known human cultures worldwide. Taken together, the whole body of cultural universals is known as the human condition. Evolutionary psychologists hold that behaviors or traits that occur universally in all cultures are good candidates for evolutionary adaptations. Some anthropological and sociological theorists that take a cultural relativist perspective may deny the existence of cultural universals: the extent to which these universals are "cultural" in the narrow sense, or in fact biologically inherited behavior is an issue of "nature versus nurture". Prominent scholars on the topic include Emile Durkheim, George Murdock, Claude Lévi-Strauss, and Donald Brown.

Donald Brown's list in Human Universals 

In his book Human Universals (1991), Donald Brown defines human universals as comprising "those features of culture, society, language, behavior, and psyche for which there are no known exception", providing a list of hundreds of items he suggests as universal. Among the cultural universals listed by Donald Brown are: 

Language and cognition

Society

Beliefs

Technology

 Shelter
 Control of fire
 Tools, tool making
 Weapons, spear
 Containers
 Cooking
 Lever
 Rope

Non-nativist explanations
The observation of the same or similar behavior in different cultures does not prove that they are the results of a common underlying psychological mechanism. One possibility is that they may have been invented independently due to a common practical problem.

Outside influence could be an explanation for some cultural universals. This does not preclude multiple independent inventions of civilization and is therefore not the same thing as hyperdiffusionism; it merely means that cultural universals are not proof of innateness.

See also
 Animal culture
 Archetype
 Biocultural anthropology
 Culture
 Social learning
 Social norm

References

Bibliography
 
 
 Joseph H. Greenberg, et al. (1978) Universals of Human Language, 4 vols. Stanford University Press. 
 Charles D. Laughlin and Eugene G. d'Aquili (1974) Biogenetic Structuralism. New York: Columbia University Press. 
 Claude Lévi-Strauss (1966) The Savage Mind. Chicago: The University of Chicago Press; London: Weidenfeld and Nicolson Ltd. . [First published in French in 1962 as La Pensee Sauvage. .]
 George P. Murdock (1945), "The Common Denominator of Culture," in The Science of Man in the World Crisis, Ralph Linton (ed.). New York: Columbia University Press. 
 Charles E. Osgood, William S May, and Murray S Miron (1975) Cross-Cultural Universals of Affective Meaning Champaign, IL: University of Illinois Press. 
 Steven Pinker (2002), The Blank Slate: The Modern Denial of Human Nature, New York: Penguin Putnam. 
 Rik Pinxten (1976). "Epistemic universals: A contribution to cognitive anthropology." (PART II: Chapter 7.) In Pinxten, Rik (ed.). Universalism Versus Relativism in Language and Thought.  The Hague: De Gruyter Mouton.  
 Brief news report of Psychological Bulletin article, Anderson, Hildreth, Howland (2015): Berkeley Haas School of Business. (May 6, 2015) "We all want high social status." ScienceDaily. Berkeley: University of California. Retrieved 24 March 2021

Culture
Evolutionary psychology
Society-related lists